Derek "Lek" Leckenby (14 May 1943 – 4 June 1994) was an English musician and lead guitarist, most famous for his work with English pop group Herman's Hermits.

Early life
Leckenby was born in Leeds. He was educated at William Hulme's Grammar School, Manchester, and commenced a civil engineering degree course at Manchester University before leaving to become a professional musician. He was performing with Manchester band The Wailers when music manager Harvey Lisberg recruited him for Herman's Hermits.

Herman's Hermits

An accomplished lead guitarist and musician, he played on many of the band's early hits and composed songs with bandmates Keith Hopwood, Peter Noone and Karl Green. He admired their record producer Mickie Most, but was bothered at times by Most's use of session musicians on the band's mid-career hits, despite the Hermits' more-than-acceptable skills as players. Leckenby played on all the band's US and UK Number One hits and provided the solo on "I'm Henry VIII, I Am". Karl Green commented on VH1's My Generation-Herman's Hermits that Most's use of session musicians on some of the band's records was unfair to Leckenby in particular. During the 1970s and 1980s, Leckenby tried to set the record straight with the rock media, explaining the large body of guitar playing he contributed to the band's records. Even the band's US label ABKCO failed to credit the Hermits' playing in the liner notes to its retrospective on the band. Leckenby's skills are apparent not only on Herman's Hermits records, but also on videos of the band's live appearances including the 1965 NME music awards and the Herman's Hermits Hilton Show. Additionally, Leckenby can be heard on several releases by Hopwood's Pluto Music, including the compilation album Vault 69.

Leckenby is credited with arranging the band's first big hit, "I'm into Something Good". His skills on guitar and dobro are heard on releases such as the LP A Whale of a Tale and the later singles, such as "Ginny Go Softly" and "Heart Get Ready for Love".

Despite the split with Noone, Leckenby always spoke highly of his friend and defended the singer's vocal abilities to critics. Noone also praised Leckenby's talent in numerous interviews over the years.

Death
Leckenby died of non-Hodgkin lymphoma on 4 June 1994 at the age of 51.

References

1943 births
1994 deaths
Musicians from Leeds
English pop guitarists
English male guitarists
Deaths from cancer in England
Deaths from non-Hodgkin lymphoma
People educated at William Hulme's Grammar School
Herman's Hermits members
20th-century English musicians
20th-century British guitarists
Beat musicians
20th-century British male musicians